Events from the year 1324 in the Kingdom of Scotland.

Incumbents
Monarch – Robert I

Events
 January – Pope John XXII acknowledges Robert the Bruce as Kings of Scots

Births
5 March – David II of Scotland (died 1371)

See also

 Timeline of Scottish history

References

 
Years of the 14th century in Scotland
Wars of Scottish Independence